Bækkelagets Sportsklub is a Norwegian sports club from Bekkelaget in southern Oslo, founded in 1909. The club has sections for skiing (including ski jumping and biathlon), orienteering, handball, football, floorball and track and field athletics, previously also bandy. It is known for organizing one of the world's largest youth football tournaments, Norway Cup.

Handball
The club consists of 850 active handball players. The women's handball team won the Women's EHF Cup Winner's Cup in 1997/1998, and again in 1998/1999. The club also reached the final in EHF Women's Champions Trophy the same two seasons. In 1998 Bækkelaget had the best women's team in Europe. The club still plays in the Norwegian top league, but ambitions are far lower than in their best period.

Among the former players on the female team are: Susann Goksør Bjerkrheim, Kjersti Grini, Heidi Tjugum, Hege Kristine Kvitsand, Camilla Andersen, Anja Andersen, Sahra Hausmann, Siv Heim Sæbøe, Cecilie Leganger, Hong Jeong-ho, Gitte Madsen, Ausra Fridrikas, Ingrid Steen.

Bækkelaget HE

Bækkelaget Håndball Elite is the elite handball department of Bækkelaget SK. The men's team plays in the top division of Norwegian handball, the Eliteserien, and the women's team plays in the Norwegian 2nd division (third tier). The men's team was known until 2013 as BSK/NIF, a cooperation team between Bækkelaget SK and Nordstrand IF. The construction of a new arena, BSK Arena, will begin in 2022.

Current squad
Squad for the 2021–22 season

Goalkeeper
 1  Mats Bjørnstad
 16  Nikolai Wiig
RW
 5  Markus Fartum
 17  Mads Ødegård
 93  Ulrik Berge Eriksson
LW 
 7  Anders Huse
 24  Christian Windt Ekeberg
Line players
 8  Sigurd Aggerholm Jensen
 15  Filiph Manfred Tilge
 26  Aksel Andre Strupstad
 31  Henrik Rifseim-Sjøstrøm

Back players
 4  Samson Bjørke Kallestad
 9  Emil Midtbø Sundal
 13  Emil Havsgård
 20  Trym Korperud Johnsen
 22  Peter Dahl Christensen
 25  Fredrik Tobias Syversen
 28  Nikolai Stabenfeldt Falao
 35  Vetle Korperud Johnsen
 44  Henrik Jevnaker

Transfers
Transfers for the 2022–23 season

 Joining

 Leaving
  Mats Bjørnstad (GK) (to  Runar Sandefjord)
  Henrik Jevnaker (LB) (to  Fjellhammer)
  Markus Fartum (RW)
  Anders Huse (LW)
  Trym Korperud Johnsen 
  Aksel Andre Strupstad
  Emil Midtbø Sundal

Notable former club players
  Christian O'Sullivan
  Johannes Hippe
  Kevin Gulliksen
  Kristian Sæverås
  Magnus Abelvik Rød

Achievements
Norwegian League
 Silver: 2016/17
 Bronze: 2013/14
Norwegian League Playoffs
 Finalist: 2013/14
Norwegian Cup:
 Winner: 1971 (outdoors)
 Finalist: 1973 (outdoors), 2013
Norwegian U20 Cup:
 Winner: 1970, 2011, 2012, 2014, 2016
 Finalist: 1965, 1969, 1972, 1974, 1975, 1976, 2018

European Record

Orienteering
Bækkelaget won the Jukola relay in 1988, 1999 and 2002. Notable orienteers who have competed for the club are Holger Hott, Bjørnar Valstad, Hanne Staff, Anne Margrethe Hausken, all world champions, and Anders Nordberg. Betty Ann Bjerkreim Nilsen competes in both orienteering and skiing.

Football

The men's team currently plays in the Fourth Division (fifth tier). It last played in the Third Division in 2004. Notable former players are Finn Seemann (funny, he broke his leg, and got 0.1 matches.) and Øyvind Bolthof (youth level only). The women's team currently plays in the Second Division. Their home field is Sportsplassen.

References

Sports clubs established in 1909
Sport in Oslo
Norwegian handball clubs
Orienteering clubs in Norway
Athletics clubs in Norway
Football clubs in Oslo
Ski jumping clubs in Norway
1909 establishments in Norway
Association football clubs established in 1909
Bandy clubs established in 1909
Defunct bandy clubs in Norway